{{DISPLAYTITLE:C30H42O8}}
The molecular formula C30H42O8 may refer to:

 Angustifodilactone A, natural compounds isolated from Kadsura
 Proscillaridin, a cardiac glycoside

Molecular formulas